Salicylate decarboxylase (salicylic acid decarboxylase, Scd) is an enzyme with systematic name salicylate carboxy-lyase. This enzyme catalyses the following chemical reaction

 salicylate  phenol + CO2

In the reverse direction the enzyme catalyses the regioselective carboxylation of phenol into salicylate.

References

External links 
 

EC 4.1.1